Regionalverkehr Mittelland AG (RM) was a 1997 merger of
 EBT - Emmental–Burgdorf–Thun-Bahn
 VHB - Vereinigte Huttwil-Bahnen
 SMB - Solothurn–Münster-Bahn
which had been under common management since 1943.

In 2006 the main owners of RM and BLS Lötschbergbahn, the Canton of Berne and the Swiss Confederation merged the two companies, forming the new BLS AG

References 

Defunct railway companies of Switzerland
Railway companies established in 1997
Railway companies disestablished in 2006
Swiss companies disestablished in 2006
Swiss companies established in 1997